The Dublin City School District is a public school district in Laurens County, Georgia, United States, based in Dublin. It serves the city of Dublin and the surrounding communities in Laurens County.

Schools
The Dublin City School District has three elementary schools, one middle school, and one high school.

Board of Education: Chairman- John Bell III
                    Vice Chairman- James Lanier
                                   Laura Travick
                                   Peggy Johnson
                                   Kenny Walters
                                 Nelson Carswell IV
                                   Bill Perry
Elementary schools:
Hillcrest Elementary School 
Susie Dasher Elementary School

Secondary schools:
Dublin Middle School
Dublin High School

Elementary/Secondary: (K - 8th grade)
THE IRISH GIFTED ACADEMY

For early college and career ready students seeking to enter into their post-secondary education or the workforce:
Heart of Georgia College & Career Academy

References

External links

School districts in Georgia (U.S. state)
Education in Laurens County, Georgia